WEAP (the Water Evaluation and Planning system) is a model-building tool for water resource planning and policy analysis and is distributed at no charge to non-profit, academic and governmental organizations in developing countries.

People can use WEAP to create simulations of water demand, supply, runoff, evapotranspiration, infiltration, crop irrigation requirements, instream flow requirements, ecosystem services, groundwater and surface storage, reservoir operations, pollution generation, treatment, discharge and instream water quality, all under scenarios of varying policy, hydrology, climate, land use, technology and socio-economic factors.  WEAP links to the USGS MODFLOW groundwater flow model and the US EPA QUAL2K surface water quality model.

WEAP was created in 1988 and continues to be developed and supported by the U.S. Center of the Stockholm Environment Institute, a non-profit research institute based at Tufts University in Somerville, Massachusetts.  It is widely used for climate change adaptation studies and has been applied by researchers and planners in thousands of organizations worldwide.

References

Sieber, J., WEAP History and Credits, WEAP Website, accessed August 14, 2020.
 Matchett, E., et al., "A Framework for Modeling Anthropogenic Impacts on Waterbird Habitats: Addressing future uncertainty in conservation planning," USGS Report, pp. 1–40, February 2015.
Sánchez-Torres Esqueda, G., et al., "Vulnerability of water resources to climate change scenarios. Impacts on the irrigation districts in the Guayalejo-Tamesí river basin, Tamaulipas, México," Atmósfera, 24 (2011), pp. 141–155, January 2011.
Purkey, D., et al., "Robust analysis of future climate change impacts on water for agriculture and other sectors: a case study in the Sacramento Valley," Climatic Change, (87) 2008, pp 109–122, March 2008.
Purkey, D., et al., "Integrating a Climate Change Assessment Tool into Stakeholder-Driven Water Management Decision-Making Processes in California," Water Resources Management, 21 (2007), pp. 315–329, January 2007.
Vogel, R., et al., "Relations Among Storage, Yield and Instream Flow," Water Resources Research, 43 (2007), W05403, May 2007.
Yates, D., et al., "WEAP21: A Demand-, Priority-, and Preference-Driven Water Planning Model, Parts 1: Model Characteristics", Water International, 30(487-500), December 2005.
Lévite, H., Sally, H., Cour, J., "Water demand management scenarios in a water-stressed basin in South Africa: application of the WEAP model," Physics and Chemistry of the Earth 28 (2003) pp. 779–786, 2003.

External links

Stockholm Environment Institute-U.S. Center
Main SEI web site
Tufts University

Integrated hydrologic modelling
Hydrology
Hydrology models
Environmental engineering
Physical geography
Scientific simulation software